The Moon and the Nightspirit is a Hungarian folk music duo founded in 2003 by Ágnes Tóth and Mihály Szabó. Their songs deal mostly with pagan fairy tales and shamanism.

History

The lyrics of their debut album Of Dreams Forgotten and Fables Untold were mostly held in English while it also featured two titles in Hungarian language. The softly melancholic album has been compared to the music of Ataraxia and Chandeen. Live performances with songs from the album included an appearance on Hungarian National Television.

The second album Regő Rejtem (lit.: I conjure Magic) was released in 2007 and is completely sung in Hungarian. During the supporting tour through much of Europe The Moon and the Nightspirit played on festivals such as Wave-Gotik-Treffen (Germany) and Castle Party (Poland).

In 2009 the band released their third album Ősforrás, a more facetted work that focuses on the "wise elder" and natural mysticism. It has been compared to the Pagan folk of Omnia but was said to be more transparent for the listener. The Side-Line magazine called it the band's most diversified and accomplished album so far.

The Moon and the Nightspirit have received favourable ratings by reviewers. Their style has been called slightly oriental as well as a mix of medieval music and Hungarian folk songs, while Ágnes Tóth's singing has been compared to Elisabeth Toriser of Dargaard. They are also acclaimed for being multi-instrumentalists using such traditional instruments as the Mongolian morin khuur and the Slovak shepherds pipe fujara.

Discography
 Of Dreams Forgotten and Fables Untold (2005)
 Regő Rejtem (2007)
 Ősforrás (2009)
 Mohalepte (2011)
 Holdrejtek (2014)
 Metanoia (2017)
 Aether (2020)

References

[ Discography] at Allmusic

External links
Official website
The Moon and the Nightspirit at Myspace

Hungarian folk music groups
Pagan-folk musicians
Musical groups established in 2003
Modern pagan musical groups